"Bring on the Lucie (Freda Peeple)" is a protest song written and performed by John Lennon from his 1973 album Mind Games.

Background
The song dates from late 1971, starting out as little more than a chorus, after Lennon acquired a National guitar. After working on the lyrics, the song went from a simple political slogan to a full-blown statement that hints at his earlier work, such as "Imagine" and "Power to the People".

Reception
Classic Rock critic Rob Hughes rated "Bring on the Lucie (Freda Peeple)" as Lennon's 7th best political song, praising Lennon's vocal performance and David Spinozza’s guitar groove, saying that "this anti-Vietnam address also acts as a scathing rebuttal of self-seeking politics."  Ultimate Classic Rock critic Nick DeRiso rated it as Lennon's 7th greatest solo political song, praising David Spinozza's slide guitar and saying that the song "eviscerates lying politicians while making an impassioned call (stop the killing!) for the end of the ongoing Vietnam conflict."

In the media
Two versions of the song, both performed by Lennon, appear in the 2006 film, Children of Men. The standard version of the song (originally released on the Mind Games album) is heard during the course of the film, and an alternate version of the song, originally released on the 1998 John Lennon Anthology boxed set, is featured over the closing credits. The John Lennon Anthology version of the song also appears on the film's soundtrack along with a cover version  by Junior Parker of "Tomorrow Never Knows," a song Lennon wrote for the Beatles album Revolver. 

The song is played during the closing credits of the 2022 Judd Apatow HBO documentary, "George Carlin's American Dream."

Personnel
John Lennon – vocals, acoustic guitar
David Spinozza – guitar
Pete Kleinow – pedal steel guitar
Ken Ascher – keyboards
 Gordon Edwards – bass guitar
Jim Keltner & Rick Marotta – drums
 Something Different – backing vocals

Covers
Richard Ashcroft released a cover of the song on 19 February 2021.

References

External links
Song lyrics

John Lennon songs
Protest songs
1973 songs
Songs written by John Lennon
Song recordings produced by John Lennon
Plastic Ono Band songs